In Greek mythology, Halmus or Almus  (Ancient Greek: Ἄλμος), also Holmos (Ὅλμος), was a Corinthian prince who later founded the Boeotian town of Halmones or Holmones, in the neighborhood of Orchomenus.

Family 
Almus was the son of King Sisyphus of Corinth and the Pleiad Merope, daughter of the Titan Atlas. He was the brother of Glaucus, Ornytion (Porphyrion) and Thersandrus.

Halmus had two daughters, Chryse and Chrysogeneia, who consorted with Ares and Poseidon, respectively. Chryse's son with Ares was Phlegyas who inherited the kingdom of Orchomenus as King Eteocles had died childless. Chrysogeneia had by Poseidon a son Chryses who succeeded Phlegyas as king of Orchomenus and in his turn became father of Minyas. In another account, the second daughter was named as Chrysogone and Minyas was given as her son by Poseidon, and not the grandson. Almus was also credited as the possible father of Minyas.

Mythology 
Most of the available information concerning Halmus was recorded in Pausanias' Description of Greece. According to the said author, Almus received a small tract of land in Orchomenus from King Eteocles and dwelt there; the village was believed to have been named Almones (later Olmones) after him. This was also mentioned by Stephanus of Byzantium, who referred to Pausanias' work but called the character as Olmus (Ὄλμος) to account for the most recent form of the village's name.

Notes

References 

 Pausanias, Description of Greece with an English Translation by W.H.S. Jones, Litt.D., and H.A. Ormerod, M.A., in 4 Volumes. Cambridge, MA, Harvard University Press; London, William Heinemann Ltd. 1918. . Online version at the Perseus Digital Library

 Pausanias, Graeciae Descriptio. 3 vols. Leipzig, Teubner. 1903.  Greek text available at the Perseus Digital Library.

 Stephanus of Byzantium, Stephani Byzantii Ethnicorum quae supersunt, edited by August Meineike (1790-1870), published 1849. A few entries from this important ancient handbook of place names have been translated by Brady Kiesling. Online version at the Topos Text Project.

Princes in Greek mythology
Kings of Minyan Orchomenus
Kings in Greek mythology
Corinthian characters in Greek mythology
Minyan mythology